Jerome Murphy (born January 13, 1987) is a former American football cornerback. He was drafted in the third round of the 2010 NFL Draft by the St. Louis Rams. He played college football for the University of South Florida.

He has also played for the New Orleans Saints, Detroit Lions, Washington Redskins, and Denver Broncos.

Early years
Murphy attended Elizabeth High School. He played defensive back and wide receiver. As a senior, he had 89 tackles and eight interceptions on defense and 582 receiving yards with seven touchdowns on offense.

College career
Murphy attended the University of South Florida from 2005 to 2009. As a senior, he was a first-team all-Big East selection by Phil Steele. During his career he started 25 of 51 games, recording 178 tackles, eight interceptions, and two forced fumbles.

Professional career

Pre-draft

St. Louis Rams

Murphy was drafted in the third round of the 2010 draft by the St. Louis Rams. He was placed on injured reserve on August 31, 2011.

New Orleans Saints
Murphy was waived by the Rams on September 1, 2012 and claimed by New Orleans Saints the next day. He was waived on September 17.

Detroit Lions
On September 18, he was claimed off waivers by the Detroit Lions.

Washington Redskins
On November 19, 2012, he was signed by the Washington Redskins. Murphy was waived on November 26, 2013.

Denver Broncos
Murphy, along with seven other players, were signed to future contracts with the Denver Broncos on January 22, 2014. He was released on August 30 for final roster cuts before the start of the 2014 season.

References

External links
South Florida Bulls bio
Washington Redskins bio
St. Louis Rams bio

1987 births
Living people
American football cornerbacks
Denver Broncos players
Detroit Lions players
Elizabeth High School (New Jersey) alumni
New Orleans Saints players
Players of American football from New Jersey
South Florida Bulls football players
Sportspeople from Elizabeth, New Jersey
St. Louis Rams players
Washington Redskins players